East Lyme Public Schools is a school district in East Lyme, Connecticut.

The district has one high school, one middle school, and three elementary schools. It is overseen by an elected 10-member board of education that serve four-year terms.

The district also serves high school students from Salem.

High school

The high school, known as East Lyme High School (grades 9-12), is located in the village of Flanders section of East Lyme. The school mascot is Sven the Viking. It serves students from not only East Lyme but also the town of Salem, Connecticut that has no high school of its own. The agreement with Salem to educate the town's high school students will continue until at least 2039, when the current co-operative agreement between the two towns expires.

The High School's many athletic teams have consistently placed among the top in the region, capturing titles in Football, Baseball, Basketball, Soccer, Crew, Swimming, Volleyball, Cross Country, Track, Lacrosse, Tennis, Fencing, Field Hockey, Wrestling, and Marching Band.

Middle school
The Middle school, known as East Lyme Middle School, or ELMS, (grades 5–8). Its mascot has changed over time; it was originally the Sabers, then changed to Hawks, and is currently a Viking to be similar to the High School. The Middle School is housed in a building that was constructed in 2002. The school is designed to employ Kivas. In this design concept, small groups of students (approximately 80) are co-located in a classroom setting, where most of their daily instruction takes place. This setting, or Kiva, consists of: 
four classrooms (one designed for science, one for mathematics, and two "linked classrooms" designed for social studies and language arts), 
restroom facilities, 
media support facilities, 
a common meeting area, 
a teacher preparation area
student lockers

The students of each Kiva do not intermingle with students from other Kivas, except for during lunch and special educational experiences. This system is criticized; some children will never meet others because each kiva stays together, only changing teachers. This structure allows a large physical plant to resemble a smaller school, while allowing students the learning opportunities (Life Skills, Technology Education, Art, Music Instruction, and Sports) that are available in a larger institution.  ELMS was designed to accommodate the 5th grade students from the town's three elementary schools (Lillie B. Haynes, Niantic Center School, and Flanders School) due to the overcrowding in these schools.  Due to COVID-19 Kivas do not intermingle at all, the schools still does a 5 day a week schedule with extra covid restrictions.  (This is subject to change as the pandemic is always changing.)

Elementary schools
Elementary Schools in East Lyme serves grades pre-K to 4.  Originally they served pre-K to 5, but there was an overcrowding in the elementary schools, so when the new Middle School was built it was designed to hold the 5th grade.

Flanders School serves most of the village of Flanders. It is located an eighth mile west of Flanders four corners, and is adjacent to East Lyme High School and the School Board offices.
Lillie B. Haynes is located in the former East Lyme Middle School is located next to the new East Lyme Middle School. The original Lille B. Haynes school building was constructed in 1952 and was demolished in the summer of 2002 to make way for the new middle school parking lot.
Niantic Center School is located in the heart of Niantic, and serves most of Niantic. The school is represented by a scallop shell. It is the oldest of the town's school buildings, with a small portion having been constructed in 1899.

References

External links
 East Lyme Schools

East Lyme, Connecticut
School districts in Connecticut
Education in New London County, Connecticut
Salem, Connecticut